Mechler is a surname. Notable people with the surname include:

Maximilian Mechler (born 1984), German ski jumper
Pia Mechler (born 1983), German actress, film director and writer
Thierry Mechler (born 1962), French classical organist
Tom Mechler (born 1956), American businessman